"Natalie Don't" is a song by British singer-songwriter Raye released on 10 July 2020 as the third single from her debut mini-album, Euphoric Sad Songs. The track was written by Raye, John Blanda and John Hill and produced by the two latter. An accompanying music video was released alongside the song on 10 July 2020.

Background and composition

Raye discussed the song's subject matter stating that the song "is my modern day Jolene" after experiencing a situation where her friend came between Raye and her partner at the time. She goes onto say; "This is why I love music because you can spin something really ugly and negative into something fabulous. I'm almost glad that it happened because now I have a great song to tell my story." Before the release of the single, Raye stated that the song was her favourite song she has ever released.

Music video
A music video directed by Fiona Jane Burgess was premiered alongside the single's release on 10 July 2020. The video consists of Raye in a pink, vintage bedroom acting out her own guide of how to get over a relationship.

Critical reception

Philip Logan of CelebMix praised the song calling the track "brooding, introspective and confessional" and adding "this is RAYE at her most frank and honest, delivering the songs relatable and conversational lyrics with delicate fragility, and blunt candour – yet still with a hint of that trademark “Rachel Agatha Keen” sass that we’ve all grown to love! As whilst there’s a genuine and tangible feeling of vulnerability that runs through the track, underneath all of the hurt, we uncover RAYE’s steely determination and willingness to forsake her own broken heart, to go into battle to try and win back the affection of her man."

Mark Savage of BBC News expressed similar praises stating that the track was "a funky, modern successor to [Dolly] Parton's classic, [Jolene].

Track listing

Charts

Weekly charts

Year-end charts

References

2020 singles
2020 songs
Polydor Records singles
Raye (singer) songs
Songs written by Raye (singer)
Songs written by John Hill (record producer)
Number-one singles in Russia